{{nihongo|Lake Unagi|鰻湖|Unagi mizūmi}} (translated as eel lake) is a Japanese maar lake associated with an eruptive vent line extending towards the sea from the parent volcano Ikeda Caldera which contains .

Geography
It is located within the city limits of Ibusuki, Kagoshima on Kyūshū island, Japan and there are associated hot springs.

Geology
Lake Unagi is within the larger and older Ata Caldera and technically its water fills in Unagi maar. Shortly after the Ikeda Caldera forming eruption of 4800 years ago a fissure vent line southeast of the caldera evolved that produced the maar eruption that formed Lake Unagi and then the pumiceous Yamagawa base surge. Ikezoko maar is more proximal in the vent line from the Ikeda Caldera to the north. Narikawa maar is to the south, between Unagi maar and the Yamagawa maar which is partially backfilled by the sea.

References 

Landforms of Kagoshima Prefecture
Volcanoes of Kagoshima Prefecture
Unagi
Maars
Unagi